Roe v. Wade was a 1973 landmark U.S. Supreme Court decision, subsequently overturned, that established a woman's constitutional right to an abortion.

Roe v. Wade may also refer to:

 Roe vs. Wade (film), a 1989 television film written by Alison Cross
 Roe v. Wade (film), a 2020 film written and directed by Nick Loeb and Cathy Allyn

See also
 2022–2023 abortion protests, also known as the Roe v. Wade protests, following the 2022 overturning of Roe v. Wade by Dobbs v. Jackson Women's Health Organization